National Highway 215 (NH 215) is a  National Highway in India. It starts from Mahadevpur and terminates at Dibrugarh in the state of Assam.

References

National highways in India
Transport in Dibrugarh